Toxteth Dock railway station was on the Liverpool Overhead Railway, adjacent to the dock of the same name and the Brunswick Goods station on the Cheshire Lines railway, England. It was situated above a London Midland & Scottish goods railway station.

It was opened on 6 March 1893 by the Marquis of Salisbury and closed, along with the rest of the line, on 30 December 1956. No evidence of this station remains.

References

External links
Toxteth railway station at Disused Stations

Disused railway stations in Liverpool
Former Liverpool Overhead Railway stations
Railway stations in Great Britain opened in 1893
Railway stations in Great Britain closed in 1956